The Avaya Virtual Services Platform 4000 series (VSP 4000) are products that, in computer networking terms, are standalone switch/routers (layer 2/layer 3) designed and manufactured by Avaya for Ethernet-based networks. The VSP 4000 hardware is a derivative of the earlier Ethernet routing switch 4000 series, leveraging certain shared components, but implementing a new, completely different, operating system derived from the virtual service platform 9000 series. The role of the VSP 4000 is to extend fabric-based network virtualization services to smaller, remote locations, thereby creating a single service delivery network.

The VSP 4000 offers a range of network virtualization services that are based on Avaya's extended implementation of Shortest Path Bridging; marketed as the 'Avaya VENA Fabric Connect' technology. The first software release supports:
 Layer 2 virtualized services that extend VLANs across the fabric (including across subnets and long distances)
 Layer 3 virtualized services that interconnect and extend VRFs across the fabric
 Native routing between layer 2 and layer 3 virtualized services for access to shared services
 IP shortcut routing that enables direct layer 3 connectivity between individual end-points without requiring deployment of an additional IGP (e.g. OSPF).

These capabilities are positioned are supporting the following deployment scenarios:
 Virtualized small and mid-sized Enterprise
 Distributed enterprise

Deployments would be made to facilitate the following business situations:
 End-to-end traffic separation for multi-tenancy or for security / regulatory compliance (i.e. PCI DSS)
 Integrated video surveillance

History 
The first VSP 4000 models were made available in April 2013.
The first models delivered in the series were:
 VSP 4850GTS, a 1RU Layer 2/Layer 3 Switch that is equipped with 48 x 10/100/1000BASE-T ports (including two common Uplink ports offering SFP connectivity) plus 2 x 10 Gigabit Ethernet ports that feature SFP+ physical connectivity.
 VSP 4850GTS-PWR+, a similar product the VSP 4850GTS, with the addition of supporting 802.3at Power-over-Ethernet Plus (PoE+) on the copper ports.
 VSP 4850GTS-DC, a similar product the VSP 4850GTS, but with DC power instead of AC.
In June 2014, a further model was added:
 VSP 4450GSX-PWR+, a 1RU Layer 2/Layer 3 Switch that is equipped with 36 x 1000BASE-SFP ports, 12 x 10/100/1000BASE-T ports that support 802.3at PoE+, plus 2 x 10GBASE-SFP+ Ethernet ports (that also support Gigabit SFPs).

See also

 Avaya
 Avaya networking products
 Avaya Government Solutions
 Avaya professional credentials
 Comparison of stackable switches
 Stackable switch
 Terabit Ethernet

References

External links 

 Avaya Virtual Services Platform 4000 Series Fact Sheet

Avaya
VSP 4000
Network architecture